Jane Farrow is a Canadian author and broadcaster and community organizer. Her written works include Wanted Words, Wanted Words 2, and (with Ira Basen, David Wallechinsky and Amy Wallace) the Canadian Book of Lists. She worked for CBC Radio from 1998 to 2007, producing segments for programs such as This Morning and The Sunday Edition, including the popular word-game segment Wanted Words (from which the books of the same name were derived). Farrow hosted and co-created other short series and shows including Workology (all about the modern workplace, cube farmers and clockwatchers) and the etymological program And Sometimes Y, Home (about people's obsession with domesticity) and The Omnivore (about people's complex relationship to food and eating).  She and her producers won a Silver Medal at the New York Radio Awards for "The Brain and Language", an episode of ‘And Sometimes Y’ on CBC Radio One in 2009.

Urban activism and work life
In the 1990s Farrow worked as a program director, manager and DJ in campus/community radio in Halifax (CKDU Program Director) and Toronto (CUIT Station Manager) while also acting as the Vice President of the National Campus and Community Radio Association (NCRA). While living in Vancouver she organized a conference for the National Association of Women and the Law in 1994. Returning to Toronto, she made several indie Super 8 films, becoming the Operations Director and Program Coordinator for the Inside Out Film and Video Festival, where she helped open the door for many LGBT film and video makers.

While a resident of Ward 18 in the Queen West Triangle, Farrow helped form and later chaired the residents' association Active 18. This coalition of citizens, residents and business-owners came together in 2005 and continues to advocate for good urban design and positive local development that genuinely contributes to and engages with local community and the city.

Farrow was the first Executive Director of Jane's Walk, the now international movement of free, locally led walking tours inspired by urbanist Jane Jacobs. The walks invite people to explore their cities, share stories and connect with neighbours. Working under the direction and guidance of  Professor Paul Hess of the University of Toronto's Department of Geography and Planning, Jane co-wrote North America's first studies of the walkability of inner-suburban high rise neighbourhoods. This research explores segments of Toronto's most densely populated but geographically isolated neighbourhoods and points to simple and inexpensive solutions for improving connectivity and accessibility. Alongside this research, the authors developed a research model and resource toolkit that can be used by communities and individual to assess their own neighbourhoods.

After five years with Jane's Walk, Farrow moved to City Hall to become executive assistant to Toronto City Councillor Mary-Margaret McMahon of Ward 32 Beaches-East York. While there, she helped forge the centrist coalition that reversed Rob Ford's proposed budget cuts to the tune of $19 million, ultimately breaking the mayor's majority hold in council and restoring funding for ice rinks, pools, community grants, homeless shelters, leaf collection and the TTC.

In 2013 she worked with the Stephen Lewis Foundation, travelling to Uganda and Tanzania. Later that year she became Policy and Campaigns Advisor to Park People, a Toronto-based non-profit helping mobilize people to work together to make local parks the best they can be.

Since 2013 Farrow has worked as an independent facilitator and community consultant, specializing in engaging neighbourhoods in dialogues about what they want in terms of urban design, planning and public spaces.

In 2014, she declared her candidacy to be Toronto City Councillor for Ward 30 Toronto-Danforth, challenging undeclared incumbent Paula Fletcher in the October 27 municipal election.

Personal life
Farrow is openly lesbian. She will be receiving a Lifetime Achievement Inspire Award in May 2014 in recognition of her contributions to LGBT visibility and the community. In 2010, she rejected the position of "Honoured Dyke" to protest the Toronto Pride Committee's banning of Queers Against Israeli Apartheid. This move was not intended as an endorsement of the group but a defence of free speech and the group's right to be present at Pride, an event Farrow felt should not be depoliticized.

Awards 
 2014 - Inspire Awards – Lifetime Achievement Award
 2013 - Spacing Magazine – 10 People We Love 
"When Jane Farrow is present, good things happen. Her warmth, energy, insight and respect for people mean that she can tell it like it is, in her signature radio-honed voice, and get people off their rear ends to do good work – all while generating an atmosphere of enthusiasm and mutual support." Spacing Magazine, Dec. 2013
 2010 - Vital People – Recognized by the Toronto Community Foundation as a leader and change-maker.
 2009 - Silver Medal, New York Radio Awards, "The Brain and Language", episode of ‘And Sometimes Y’ on CBC Radio One.
 2009 - Active Transportation Champion – On behalf of Jane's Walk, from the Toronto Coalition for Active Transportation.

Accolades for Jane's Walk
 2013 - Canadian Urban Institute – 2013 City Soul Award
Jane's Walk was presented with the CUI's City Soul award for facilitating and promoting volunteer-led walks that help people understand and learn about their neighborhoods, and that foster urban literacy and civic engagement.

Toronto city council election results
2014 Toronto election, Ward 30 Toronto—Danforth

References

External links 
 

CBC Radio hosts
Canadian lesbian writers
Living people
Canadian lexicographers
Canadian LGBT broadcasters
1961 births
Women lexicographers
Canadian women radio hosts